Stoyan Christowe (also known as Stojan Hristoff) was an American author, journalist and noted Vermont political figure. Born in then Konomladi (then a part of the Ottoman Empire), he is best remembered as the author of six books written about the Balkans and as a Vermont legislator committed to promoting social justice and literacy. He was awarded an honorary doctorate from the Ss. Cyril and Methodius University of Skopje in the Socialist Republic of Macedonia and was elected an honorary member of the Macedonian Academy of Arts and Sciences (MANU).

Early life

Stoyan Christowe (Naumof) was born in Ottoman Macedonia, in the village of Konomladi, (present-day Makrochori in Greece) on September 1, 1898, to Mitra and Christo Naumof as the first of three children (including a brother Vasil and a sister Mara).
Born at a time when the Ottoman Empire was disintegrating, Stoyan, like many children, dreamed of being a komitadji, a freedom fighter, who would, unlike the heroes of bygone days, succeed in overthrowing what had become the oppressive, 500-year long Ottoman rule and bring freedom and liberty to Macedonia.

After the failure of the Ilinden-Preobrazhenie Uprising, many locals started leaving, seeking better economic life in America. Some would periodically come back to the village like triumphant heroes, wearing new and exotic clothes, sporting gold teeth, carrying gold watches and most importantly telling fantastic stories about this magical America. Stoyan longed to discover this place where wires encased in glass bulbs illuminated houses instead of candles; where horseless carriages, not mules, were used to transport people. He developed a burning need to live in this far-off country. Not for money, not for prestige – no, he was driven by a passion to know and understand America and become one with it.

The Amerikantzi of my boyhood days brought back to my native soil a powerful virus, an infectious America-mania that affected the young and middle-aged so that they were no longer content to till the thin mountain soil.

In 1911, aged 13, Stoyan Naumoff (he would later change his name to Hristov,  and in 1924  anglicize it to "Christowe") boarded the "Oceanic" in Naples, Italy—destination America.  Ellis Island records indicate that he passed himself off as a 16-year-old Italian named Giovanni Chorbadji believing that he would be admitted to the US easier if he were not  a "Balkan peasant."

Following his immigration screening at Ellis Island, he immediately headed to St. Louis. There he bunked in squalid conditions with other men from Macedonia, taking on a succession of menial jobs, first in a shoe factory, then as a soda jerk and later in St. Louis Union Station. The pay was low, the days were long and the work was both dangerous and boring to this young man, whose every waking moment seemed to be dedicated to assimilating the country he had already adopted in his mind.  As he gradually learned English, he absorbed all that he could around him about this strange new world. To his uncle, and nearly all who lived in their transplanted Balkan world, the sole objective was to live as cheaply as possible for a few years, work endlessly, save money, then to return to Macedonia to "live like a pasha."

Their beings were not inoculated with the leaven of America that worked so powerfully with earlier immigrants from other lands. They were familiar with the heat of the steel mills and iron foundries and roundhouses but never came in contact with the heat of the melting pot. America had not put her finger on their minds or hearts as it had done to millions before them and as it would to their children and grandchildren.

Life in the United States 

But Stoyan did not share their goals or values and thus distanced himself from his fellow villagers. America had stolen his mind and heart and it was in this country that he planned to stay, striving to become more and more Americanized each day.

With my growing knowledge of the language America itself grew before my vision, etched itself out more clearly, and captivated my soul more enduringly. There began to seep through my being, like a strong potion, a vitalizing American serum. My young body became possessed of a passionate yearning to be absorbed by America. I longed, like a youth in love, to lay my head on the breast of America.

After 3 years in St. Louis Stoyan left on a journey that would take him across America. First, traveling west, he worked for the Union Pacific Railway in Montana and Wyoming. In 1918 he enrolled at  Valparaiso University to get his high school diploma and there he began his writing career as a contributor to the Torch, the college newspaper.

In 1922 he moved to a Chicago suburb in search of a real job and eventually started freelancing as a book reviewer for the Chicago Daily News. Between 1927 and 1929 he was dispatched to the Balkans as a correspondent. During this time he was stationed in Bulgaria and became a comrade of Aleksandar Balabanov and Elin Pelin. In 1928 Hristov visited Greece, but not his village due to fears to be conscripted as a soldier in the Greek army. As a correspondent in Sofia he interviewed Ivan Mihailov, Tsar Boris III, Vlado Chernozemski and others. Stoyan eventually became a well-recognized expert on that region and his book, Heroes and Assassins, became required reading for those seeking to understand the post-World War Balkans, and the factional politics of Macedonia, the principal player in it being the Internal Macedonian Revolutionary Organization.

I belong spiritually as well as chronologically to the generations of immigrants who had to Americanize as well as acculturate, integrate, assimilate, coalesce, all at the same time. With me, the process had begun even before I had set foot on American soil. Robert Frost expressed it when he said at John F. Kennedy’s inauguration that ‘We were the land, before the land was ours.

Christowe visited Bulgaria once again in 1934, just after the military government crackdown on the IMRO. In the 1930s Stoyan moved to New York City and spent ten years penning articles and writing book reviews for major magazines of the day, like the Dial, the Story Magazine, Harper's Bazaar and a myriad of others, establishing himself as a respected author and critic. Stoyan's fourth book, "This is My Country", was in fact found on president Franklin D. Roosevelt bedside table when he died, a present from his wife Eleanor.

In his thirties Stoyan began a quest to untangle his roots. He had struggled with the issue of his identity since his teenage years. In 1929, in an article in The Outlook and Independent he addressed the issue candidly:
What has been there result of this long gestation in the womb of America? Despite the readiness and zeal with which I tossed myself in the melting pot I still am not wholly an American and never will be.  It is not my fault. I have done all I could. America will not accept me. America wanted more, it wanted complete transformation inward and outward. That is impossible in one generation. Then what is my fate?  What am I? Am I still what I was before I came to America, or am I a half American and half something else? To me, precisely, there lies our tragedy. I am neither one nor the other, I am an orphan.  Spiritually, physically, linguistically I have not been wholly domesticated.

His passage from discombobulated newcomer, to hyphenated-American, to articulate chronicler of the migrant’s experience, offers a primary source that changes over the thirty years of his writing.

Personal life

In 1939, Stoyan married Margaret Wooters, a writer from Philadelphia. They had met seven years earlier while he was working on his first book, Heroes and Assassins, as a writer in residence at the Yaddo Writing Retreat.

He and Margaret moved to Vermont in 1939. In 1941, shortly after the US entered World War II, Stoyan was called to duty and worked as a military analyst covering the Balkans in the War Department for two years, 1941 to 1943. In December 1943 he returned to Vermont and refocused on his true calling, writing.

He spent the next ten years writing articles, editorial pieces and book reviews for major American newspapers and magazines. However, the matters of his identity, his roots, and his place in American society continued to haunt him.

In the first half of his life, Stoyan Christowe identified himself as Bulgarian, but after World War II and the establishment of the Macedonian state within the Yugoslav Federation, he redefined his understanding of who he was, and proclaimed himself an ethnic Macedonian.  This change was a result of the fact, that during the 20th century, the Slav Macedonian national feelings had shifted. At the beginning of the 20th century, Slavic patriots in Macedonia felt a strong attachment to their homeland, but most of them saw themselves as Bulgarians. By the middle of the 20th. century, however Macedonian Slavs began to see Macedonian and Bulgarian loyalties as mutually exclusive and Macedonian regionalism had become Macedonian nationalism.

In the early 1950s he traveled through Austria, Germany and Yugoslavia speaking at college campuses and lecturing about American ideals. In 1952, Stoyan visited Skopje, the capital of Yugoslav Macedonia. The culture he walked away from as a child he began to embrace as a man. We also glimpse at the democratic values that Stoyan had come to cherish and the strength of his personality when,  in 1953, he met Marshal Josip Broz Tito in Belgrade. In relentless defense of the freedom of expression, Stoyan did not hesitate to criticize the Marshal for his treatment of political dissidents.

In 1985 he revisited Yugoslavia, where he was awarded with the title Doctor Honoris Causa of the University of Sts. Cyril & Methodius in Skopje.

Work and political career

After graduating from Valparaiso University, Stojan became a correspondent for the Chicago Daily News.

A 'New Yorker' from 1930 to 1939 he worked as a freelance writer and from 1941 to 1943 as a military analyst at the War Department.
In Vermont, from January 1944 to 1959 he was a writer, book reviewer, lecturer and newspaper correspondent for The North American Newspaper Alliance from 1951 to 1952.

In 1960, as Stoyan continued his quest to understand the meaning of 'Americanness', and, relentless in his effort to become an exemplary American, he run for a seat in the Vermont Legislature, won and served as a state representative from 1961 to 1962.

In 1963 he ran for a senate seat, and won the Republican nomination for his county by a landslide. Reelected in 1968, he retired in 1972  and was succeeded by republican Robert Gannet.

His colleague, senator William Doyle, called him "an original" and his fight for freedom, equality and education for all is best remembered in a speech he made on the occasion of a proposed amendment to change the Constitution of Vermont.

Retiring from the Senate in 1972, Stoyan immediately went back to his writing. His last autobiographical novel, The Eagle and the Stork, was published in 1976 and is by far his most widely read book.

Stoyan Christowe enjoyed relative notoriety as a writer during the 1930 and 1940s.  As an author he had the power to move and persuade, and his many works, especially those written during his years as a correspondent in the Balkans, add to our understanding of Southeastern European history between the two World Wars. At home, during his years as a politician he served as a beacon shining light on what was good and right in America.  But, his message to those not born in the US was to have faith in oneself, accept this country and its language and grow with it, and embrace one's own inner changes. And, he admonished, embrace your roots as well. "America has room for people who are Americans with origins elsewhere, it is the genius of the country."

Legacy

 In 2006, the Macedonian Arts Council in a joint venture with the city government of Dover, Vermont erected a land marker, to honor its most famous resident.
 In 2010,The Stoyan Christowe Scholarship Fund was established by the Macedonian Arts Council and is available only to students of literature and political science, at universities in Macedonia.

Bibliography

Books
Heroes and Assassins, Robert M. McBride, (1935) (Хероu и убujцu, Мuсла 1985)
Mara, Thomas Y. Crowell Co., (1937) (Една Българка, Смрикаров, 1943); (Мара, Мuсла -1985)
This is my country, Carrick & Evans, Inc., (1938)(Ова е моjaта татковuна, Мuсла 1985) - one of the favorite books of Franklin Roosevelt.
The Lion Of Yanina, Modern Age Books, (1941) (Лavoт oд Janina, 1985)
My American Pilgrimage, Little, Brown and Company, 1947  (Ṃоjoт Амерuканскu Аu̯uлак, Мuсла 1985)
The Eagle and the Stork, Harper’s Magazine Press, (1976)  (Орелот u штркот, Мuсла 1985)
The Immigrant’s Bride („Невестата на доселеникот“), изд. куќа „Дијалог“, Скопје (2010) (in Macedonian)
 Partial bibliography of Stoyan Christowe's writings

See also

Macedonian writers
Macedonian American
Macedonian nationalism

References

External links
 Stoyan Christowe - Vermont Historical Society.
 Bibliography of Stoyan Christowe's works
 My American Pilgrimage Movie
 Macedonian Arts Council
 

1898 births
1995 deaths
Macedonian writers
American people of Macedonian descent
Bulgarians from Aegean Macedonia
American people of Bulgarian descent
Articles containing video clips
People from Korestia
People from Brattleboro, Vermont
Emigrants from the Ottoman Empire to the United States